David Carlton Pepper Farm is a historic home and farm located near Georgetown, Sussex County, Delaware.  It is dated to the mid-19th century, and is a 2-story, six bay, single-pile frame and shingle farmhouse with a -story side wing.  It has a one-story wing attached to the rear of the -story side wing. A one-story kitchen wing was added to the -story side wing about 1935. The oldest section of the house is the -story side wing and dates to about 1820 and is in the late-Federal style, with the main house added in the 1840s.  The newer section features Greek Revival style interior details.  Also on the property are notable mid-19th century outbuildings including a milk house, privy, and smoke house; a barn, a frame granary, a log corn crib,
and an extremely early Sussex County poultry house (1916).

The site was added to the National Register of Historic Places in 1979.

References

Farms on the National Register of Historic Places in Delaware
Federal architecture in Delaware
Greek Revival houses in Delaware
Houses in Georgetown, Delaware
National Register of Historic Places in Sussex County, Delaware